Ibtoihi Hadhari (born 3 October 2003) is a Comorian professional football player who plays for Olympique de Marseille II.

International career 
Ibtoihi Hadhari made his international debut for the Comoros on the 1st September 2021 during the 7-1 friendly win against the Seychelles, their biggest win ever. Wearing number 9, Hadhari replaced Faïz Selemani and delivered an assist during the game.

References

External links
Comoros football profile

2003 births
Living people
Comorian footballers
Comoros under-20 international footballers
Comoros international footballers
Association football forwards